Tech Jacket is a six issue American comic book created by writer Robert Kirkman and artist E. J. Su, published monthly by Image Comics in November 2002 to April 2003. Starting in Invincible #71, an 8-part backup series ran, continuing the storyline from the original series.  In the main comic, Tech-Jacket joined the Viltrumite war.  This was followed by a new comic book series which ran twelve issues (July 2014 to December 2015).  All issues have been collected into 4 graphic novels.

Fictional character biography

Zack Thompson, a high school kid, finds a dying alien from a race of incredibly intelligent but physically weak beings called the Geldarians. To make up for this they have invented the Tech Jacket, a vest that every Geldarian is equipped with upon birth. Seeing the human and knowing his crashed spaceship is going to blow up and kill them both, the alien fits him with the Tech Jacket, saving his life. But now the Tech Jacket can't be removed and gives Zack "the most powerful weapons in the universe". After saving his father (who is therefore aware of the Tech Jacket), Zack tells him about the crashed spaceship and dying alien. Later, the Geldarians show up, thinking Zack killed their comrade Kelda (the alien) and stole the Tech Jacket. After helping the Geldarians fight the Kresh, the Geldarians felt grateful towards him.

He appeared in Invincible #71, working on a space station with his father. The station was implied to have been built by him. According to a conversation he had with Allen the Alien, he mainly involves himself in galactic events, and calls himself a "galactic guardian" instead of a superhero. He was recruited by Allen and Nolan to accompany them to fight against the Viltrumites. While on board a spaceship with Invincible, they were attacked by Conquest and two additional Viltrumites.

Features
Removal is unpermitted, under executive decree 574-3.
The vest gives him near-invulnerability, super-strength, flight, energy blasts, and a variety of gizmos.
The jacket has an ability known as Host Maintenance which when activated removes and destroys all germs, bacteria and dirt from the user's body, removing the need to bathe.

According to Zack, because a human is already physically stronger than a Geldarian, he is more capable of using the tech jacket and is a natural with it. Additionally, in his most recent appearance, Zack has become physically stronger than in his original series, which implies that his tech jacket strength has increased as well.

References

External links
 Paul O'Brien's November 2002 review of Tech Jacket #1
 
 

Fictional armour
Image Comics characters who can move at superhuman speeds
Image Comics characters with superhuman strength
Image Comics male superheroes
2002 comics debuts
Skybound Entertainment titles
Skybound Entertainment superheroes
Characters created by Robert Kirkman
Comics by Robert Kirkman